Everitte Barbee (born 1988) is an American Arabic Calligrapher known for works that incorporate religious, literary and pop culture messages. His works juxtapose traditional Arabic scripts with modern imagery to convey strong political messages. All of his works currently incorporate the Diwani Jali script.

Biography 
Everitte was born in Nashville, Tennessee and attended the Montgomery Bell Academy. Everitte later graduated from the University of Edinburgh in Scotland with a Masters in International Business and Arabic. During a semester abroad in 2009, he started learning Arabic Calligraphy from the master calligrapher Adnan Farid. He moved to Beirut to continue developing his skills, learning more about Arabic Calligraphy, as well as improving his Arabic in 2010.

Career 
Everitte started working on the "Quran for Solidarity" project as a way to improve his calligraphy skills. He began writing Surahs from the Quran in geometric shapes as a way to practice the art. Following the controversy surrounding the construction and operation of the Islamic Center of Murfreesboro, Barbee was inspired to expand his project and develop one piece for each Surah of the Quran, as a way of creating appreciation for the Quran among his peers in the west.

Exhibitions
 2012 - "Maktoob", Art Lounge, Beiteddine
 2013 - The Beirut Bloom: Contemporary Art Fair, Beirut, Lebanon
 2013 - Beirut Art Book Fair, Beirut, Lebanon
 2014 - Eternity, for Now; Al Riwaq Art Space, Bahrain
 2014 - AltCity, Beirut, Lebanon
 2017 - Hafez Gallery, Jeddah, Saudi Arabia
 2019 - US Consulate, UAE

References

External links 
 Official Website Arabic Calligraphy by Everitte Barbee
 Latest Works Everitte Barbee

Calligraphers of Arabic script
American artists
1988 births
Living people